Heritage Commercials is a British magazine for classic and vintage commercial vehicle enthusiasts. It is published on a monthly basis since 1987.  The magazine was part of Mortons Media Group until 2016 when it was acquired by Kelsey Media. David Craggs and Stephen Pullen served as the editor of the magazine when it was part of Mortons Media Group.

The magazine typically contains historical information as well as coverage of vehicle preservation efforts.

References

External links
 Official magazine website

1987 establishments in the United Kingdom
Automobile magazines published in the United Kingdom
Magazines established in 1987
Monthly magazines published in the United Kingdom